Sweatshop Union is a Canadian hip hop collective based in Vancouver, British Columbia, consisting of  four politically-minded rap acts — Dirty Circus, Pigeon Hole (aka "Creative Minds"), Kyprios and Innocent Bystanders. Known for their socially conscious lyrics, Sweatshop Union's music comments on issues ranging from the war in Iraq, the plight of the poor and working-class, to the negativity and misogyny of mainstream hip-hop.

History
In 2000, the members of Dirty Circus, Pigeon Hole, Kyprios and Innocent Bystanders came together to produce an album. The result, titled Wildlife Canada, was released in 2000.

In 2001, they collaborated again, this time forming Sweatshop Union as their group name where they produced and then independently published their first album "local.604" in 2002 through Metty the Dert Merchant's company "Dert Merchant Undertakings".
The title of the album refers to the fact that they represent the local district members of a "Sweatshop Union" (Trade Union), using the number "604" which is an area code in their hometown of Vancouver, British Columbia.

The band signed with Battleaxe Records later in 2002 and re-released local.604 after re-recording some of the tracks, removing a track, and adding some additional ones. The group also began touring North America with a number of other rap and hip-hop artists, including their label-mates Swollen Members.

Current members of the group include Metty the Dert Merchant, Mos Eisley, DJ Itchy Ron, Marmalade, Steve Hawking (previously known as Treefrog/Conscience), Dusty Melo, and most recently Ray Black. Like other hip-hop collectives, the members of Sweatshop Union continue to work, perform and produce separately in addition to their work with the band. Pigeon Hole, Dirty Circus and Metty's side project Trillionaire$ each released albums in 2010. As of 2011, Kyprios has left the group to pursue his solo career.

Their 2004 album Natural Progression led to a Juno Award nomination and three Western Canadian Music Award nominations.  They have been called part of "Vancouver's hip-hop renaissance", and had their music featured in CBC Radio's Make Some Noise documentary. They have expanded their touring to the east coast, hoping to increase awareness about their music.

The band's fourth studio album, Water Street, was released in 2008.  In early 2009, Sweatshop Union's "Oh My" won in the 8th Annual Independent Music Awards for Best Rap/Hip-Hop Song.

This was followed up by three albums, one from  each of Sweatshop Union's sub-groups Dirty Circus, Pigeon Hole, Kyprios and Innocent Bystanders.

Sweatshop's The Bill Murray EP, was released March 1, 2011 on Urbnet Records. It features eight songs, and production from Pigeon Hole, Rob the Viking, and Preme Diesel and won the 2011 Western Canadian Music Awards' Hip Hop Album of the Year. This is the first album on which former group member Kyprios has not appeared.

Sweatshop released The Leisure Gang EP on July 3, 2012 as a free download.

On May 28, 2013 they released their fifth LP titled Infinite, which featured artists Mos Eisley, Marmalade, Ray Black, Metty the Dert Merchant, Dusty Melo, Conscience (Tree Frog) and Dave Knill, with guest verses from Snak the Ripper, Def 3, and Claire Mortifee.

Discography
 local.604 (2002)
 Natural Progression (2004)
 United We Fall (2005)
 Water Street (2008)
 The Bill Murray EP (2011)
 Infinite (2013)

References

Musical groups established in 2000
Musical groups from Vancouver
Canadian hip hop groups
Hip hop collectives
Independent Music Awards winners
2000 establishments in British Columbia